Michelle Moran (born August 11, 1980) is an American novelist known for her historical fiction writing.

Biography
Michelle Moran was born in California's San Fernando Valley, August 11, 1980. She took an interest in writing from an early age, purchasing Writer's Market and submitting her stories and novellas to publishers from the time she was twelve. She majored in literature at Pomona College. Following a summer in Israel where she worked as a volunteer archaeologist, she earned an MA from the Claremont Graduate University.

Her experiences at archaeological sites were what inspired her to write historical fiction. A public high school teacher for six years, Moran is currently a full-time writer living in California.

Moran is the author of the national bestselling historical fiction novels Nefertiti, The Heretic Queen, and Cleopatra's Daughter. Her fourth book, Madame Tussaud, was optioned by Gaumont for a miniseries in 2011. Michael Hirst is writing the script. Her fifth book, "The Second Empress," explores the lives of the women in Napoleon Bonaparte's world.
Her sixth book, Rebel Queen, is set in India and talks about the queen Lakshmibai of Jhansi. Her latest book is "Mata Hari's Last Dance."

Bibliography

 Nefertiti: A Novel (2007) This novel tells the story of Nefertiti's sister Mutnodjmet and the events of Nefertiti's marriage to Amenhotep IV until the time of her death. According to WorldCat, the book is held in 984 libraries.
 The Heretic Queen (2008) This novel tells the story of Nefertari, wife of Ramesses the Great and niece of the "heretic queen", Nefertiti.
 Cleopatra's Daughter (2009) This novel tells the story of Cleopatra Selene II and Alexander Helios, the twin children of Cleopatra VII and Mark Antony, in the aftermath of the great queen's death as well as living in Rome in the court of Octavian.
 Madame Tussaud: A Novel of the French Revolution (2011) This novel tells the story of Marie Grosholtz, the future "Madame Tussaud", and her rise to prominence as a wax artist during the French Revolution.
 The Second Empress: A Novel of Napoleons Court (2012) This novel tells the story of the Marie Louise, Duchess of Parma, Empress of France and Pauline Bonaparte.
 Rebel Queen (2015) This novel tells the story of the Rani of Jhansi.
 Mata Hari's Last Dance (2016) This novel tells the story of the Mata Hari.
 Reinventing von Trapp (2022/2023?) This novel tells the story of Maria von Trapp.

References

External links
 Michelle Moran's official website

Living people
21st-century American novelists
American women novelists
1980 births
21st-century American women writers
Pomona College alumni